The 2d Reconnaissance Group is an inactive United States Air Force unit. It was last assigned to the Third Air Force, being stationed at Will Rogers Field, Oklahoma. It was inactivated on 1 May 1944.

The unit was active during World War II as a reconnaissance and mapping training unit, initially being assigned to Second Air Force, then to Third Air Force in October 1943. The group also trained crews and occasionally provided personnel to help man new groups and squadrons. Aircraft included B-17s, B-24s, B-25s, L-4s, L-5s, P-38s, and A-20s.

History

Lineage
 Constituted as 2d Photographic Group on 1 May 1942
 Activated on 7 May 1942
 Redesignated: 2d Photographic Reconnaissance and Mapping Group in May 1943
 Redesignated: 2d Photographic Reconnaissance Group in August 1943
 Disbanded on 1 May 1944

Assignments
 II Air Support Command, 7 May 1942
 III Air Support Command, 7 October 1943 – 1 May 1944

Components
 6th Photographic Squadron: 1942
 7th Photographic Reconnaissance Squadron: 1942–1944
 10th Photographic Reconnaissance Squadron: 1942–1944
 11th (formerly 5th) Combat Mapping Squadron: 1942–1944
 29th Photographic Reconnaissance Squadron: 1943–1944.

Stations
 Bradley Field, Connecticut, 7 May 1942
 Colorado Springs Army Air Base, Colorado, c. 13 May 1942
 Will Rogers Field, Oklahoma, c. 7 October 1943 – 1 May 1944.

References

 Maurer, Maurer (1983). Air Force Combat Units of World War II. Maxwell AFB, Alabama: Office of Air Force History. .

External links

Military units and formations established in 1942
002
1942 establishments in Connecticut
1944 disestablishments in Oklahoma